Singhanagar is a village located in Sujanagar Upazila, Pabna District, Bangladesh.

References

Populated places in Pabna District